PDRS may refer to:
 Payload Deployment and Retrieval System
 Probe Data Relay Subsystem